Brasswind is an album by saxophonist Gene Ammons recorded in late 1973 and early 1974 and released on the Prestige label.

Reception

The Allmusic review by Scott Yanow states, "Ammons plays well and even if the arrangements are somewhat dated (George Duke's keyboards do not help), this set has its strong moments".

Track listing 
All compositions by Gene Ammons except where noted.
 "Cántaro" (David Axelrod) – 3:58 
 "Brasswind" – 5:03 
 "Solitario" (Axelrod) – 5:47 
 "Cariba" (Wes Montgomery) – 4:57 
 "Once I Loved" (Antonio Carlos Jobim) – 6:15 
 "'Round Midnight" (Thelonious Monk) – 7:53 
 "Rozzie" – 4:40

Personnel 
Gene Ammons – tenor saxophone 
Allen DeRienzo, Snooky Young – trumpet
George Bohanon  – trombone
Prince Lasha – alto flute (tracks 2 & 3)
Bill Green, Jay Migliori – flute, alto flute, alto saxophone
Jim Horn – flute, alto flute, baritone saxophone
George Duke – keyboards
Michael Howell, Don Peake (tracks 1, 2, 4, 5 & 7) – guitar
Carol Kaye – electric bass (tracks 1, 2, 4, 5 & 7)
Walter Booker – bass (tracks 3 & 6)
John Guerin (tracks 1, 2, 4, 5 & 7), Roy McCurdy (tracks 3 & 6) – drums
Berkeley Nash – percussion (tracks 1, 2, 4, 5 & 7) 
David Axelrod – arranger, conductor

References 

1974 albums
Prestige Records albums
Gene Ammons albums
Albums produced by Orrin Keepnews